Minolia rotundata is a species of sea snail, a marine gastropod mollusk in the family Solariellidae.

Description
The height of the shell attains 3½ mm, its diameter also 3½ mm. The shell has a globose-conoidal shape and is profoundly umbilicated. It contains 4½ convex whorls with a short and obtuse spire. It is spirally lirated. The sutures are canaliculated. The body whorl is ventricated and has a slight angle. The aperture is rounded. There is a thick nodulous ridge bordering the umbilicus.

Distribution
This species occurs off Hong Kong.

References

External links

rotundata
Gastropods described in 1894